The Texas Tennis Classic is a professional tennis tournament played on hard courts. It is currently part of the Association of Tennis Professionals (ATP) Challenger Tour. It was first held in Waco, Texas, United States in 2023.

Past finals

Singles

Doubles

References

ATP Challenger Tour
Hard court tennis tournaments
Tennis tournaments in the United States
Recurring sporting events established in 2023